Oliver Njego (Serbian Cyrillic: Оливер Њего) is a Serbian operatic baritone, who also crossed over into popular music.

Biography 
He graduated in 1990, at the Faculty of Music Art in Belgrade in the class of Professor Radmila Bakočević. In 1991 becomes the member of National Theatre in Belgrade opera department, where he performed in Gioachino Rossini's The Barber of Seville, Donizetti's L'elisir d'amore, and many other famous operas. He has won three major awards at the competition Belgrade Spring, and won many prizes in various cultural events throughout the country and the world. Until now, he has performed in China, United Arab Emirates, France, Italy, Korea, Great Britain, Hungary, Republic of Macedonia, and many other countries. With his godfather Predrag Miletić, actor of the National Theater, he has traveled for several years in a row with a bike to the monastery Hilandar on Mount Athos in Greece. Their journey was published in the book Biciklom do Hilandara by Predrag Miletić.

He is married to Jasna, with whom he has three children.

References

 Jasna i Oliver Njego: Rupice na njenim obrazima, Politika, 26.11.2006.
 Biciklom do Hilandara ("By bicycle to Hilandar") by Predrag Miletić.

External links 
 Photographs of Jadranka Jovanović and Olivera Njego in Smederevo

1959 births
Living people
Operatic baritones
Musicians from Niš
20th-century Serbian male opera singers